Killing Reagan is a 2016 American television drama film directed by Rod Lurie and written by Eric Simonson. It is based on the 2015 book of the same name by Bill O'Reilly and Martin Dugard. The film stars Tim Matheson, Cynthia Nixon, Joe Chrest, Joel Murray, Kyle S. More, and Michael H. Cole. The film premiered on October 16, 2016, on the National Geographic Channel.

Plot
The film opens at a Jimmy Carter re-election campaign rally in Nashville, Tennessee.

William Casey is serving as Reagan's campaign manager in 1980.

Reagan's would-be assassin, John Hinckley, is seen purchasing a Röhm gun. On October 28, 1980, Reagan and Carter debate in Cleveland, Ohio. Later, Hinckley hears about the assassination of John Lennon and develops a fascination with Mark David Chapman.

After Ronald Reagan recovers from the assassination attempt, Nancy Reagan hires the astrologer Joan Quigley.

Cast
Tim Matheson as Ronald Reagan
Cynthia Nixon as Nancy Reagan
Jeff Harlan as Michael Deaver
Joe Chrest as Jerry Parr
Joel Murray as Edwin Meese
Kyle S. More as John Hinckley Jr.
Michael H. Cole as James Brady
Geoff Pierson as James Baker
Patrick St. Esprit as Alexander Haig
Ashley LeConte Campbell as Jim Baker's Secretary
Gary Weeks as Stephen Colo
Mike Pniewski as Jack Hinckley
Leander Suleiman as Dr. Joyce Mitchell
Rebecca Tilney as Jo Ann Hinckley
Kristen Shaw as Cheryl Chris
James Martin Kelly as Donald Regan
Daniel Thomas May as David Stockman
Jason Vail as Dennis McCarthy
Kendrick Cross as Danny Spriggs
Katia Lara as Jodie Foster
Bill Winkler as Caspar Weinberger
Dustin Lewis as Ted Graber
Jeff Rose as George Opfer
Anthony Collins as Dr. F Fagan
Amber Erwin as Katie
Keith Hudson as Rocky
John L. Smith Jr. as Jimmy Carter
David Alexander as George Chmiel
Brian F. Durkin as Detective Eddie Myers
Jim Dougherty as Judge William Higgins
Kathrine Barnes as Kat
Tom Hillmann as Dr. Joseph Giordano
Joseph Lacy as Ray Shaddick
Chris Hlozek as Robert Wanko
David A. MacDonald as Tim McCarthy
Sue Cremin as Nurse Wendy Koenig
Annie Humphrey as Sarah Brady
Trey McGriff as David C. Fischer
Darian Fisher as Kent Wood

Production
On September 22, 2015, the National Geographic Channel and Scott Free Productions acquired rights to the book Killing Reagan. On May 6, 2016, Tim Matheson and Cynthia Nixon joined the cast to play Ronald Reagan and Nancy Reagan.

Reception
Killing Reagan has a 63% rating on the Rotten Tomatoes review aggregator.

The Hollywood Reporter said the film was the best of the "Killing" adaptations to date, but said the film "doesn’t exactly know where to begin and runs out of energy in the aftermath of Reagan’s recovery from a killing that didn’t occur." A review in People magazine said that Mathieson "captures the essence of the Reagan persona" but that "Cynthia Nixon’s Nancy is rather pointedly lacking in depth."

Accolades 
Killing Reagan received three Critics' Choice Television Award nominations for its seventh annual awards.

References

External links
 

2016 television films
2016 films
2016 drama films
2010s English-language films
American biographical drama films
Attempted assassination of Ronald Reagan
Films about Ronald Reagan
Biographical television films
American drama television films
Films about elections
Films based on works by Bill O'Reilly (political commentator)
Films based on non-fiction books
Films directed by Rod Lurie
Films scored by David Buckley
Films set in 1980
Films set in 1981
Films set in California
Films set in Colorado
Films set in Tennessee
Films set in Virginia
Films set in Washington, D.C.
Films set in the White House
National Geographic (American TV channel) original programming
Television films based on books
2010s American films